The Winnit Club is a voluntary service organisation that has been going to Rottnest Island since 1931. Primarily the Winnits do work on the island under the direction of the Rottnest Island Authority that benefits all those who use the island for work and recreation. Club members raise funds and provide their expertise and labour for many of these requirements. 
The club specialises in the construction of access boardwalks and stairs.

Projects 

Some of the activities club members have been involved with include:
 Raised the funds to build the island's first nursing post in 1960 and paid the wages of the nurse Fay Sullivan
 The original ‘Quokka Shelter’ and West End board walk
 Installing emergency lighting at the airport
 Restoration of the Oliver Hill Gun Battery
 Installation of stairs at Bathurst Lighthouse, Salmon Bay, Fay's Bay and Narrow Neck
 Paving of the P Hut and train shed, construction of all the railway stations platforms and shelters
 Painting the seawall twice from end to end
 Maintaining the museum
 Beach access paths and all of the fencing from Villa Kitson to Bathurst Lighthouse
 Restoring the headstones, fencing and maintaining the cemetery 
 Survey of the coastal risk signs and developing a database including the GPS location of each sign.
 Constructing the boardwalk at the West End
 Constructing the stairs from Pinky's Beach to the Bathurst lighthouse
 The steps and fencing at Geordie Bay 
 Installation of five environmentally friendly toilets costing $650,000 at Parker point   
 $141,000 grant from Coastwest to construct the walkway and tiered stairs at Henrietta Rocks (in conjunction with the Rottnest Society and the Rottnest Foundation)

References

Further reading 
.

External links 

Rottnest Island Authority

Clubs and societies in Australia
Environmental organisations based in Australia
Rottnest Island